The abbreviated name semi-p could refer to either of the following two North American shorebird species:

 Semipalmated plover
 Semipalmated sandpiper